Valentin Ivanovich Muratov (30 July 1928 – 6 October 2006) was a Russian gymnast and gymnastics coach. He competed at the 1952 and 1956 Olympics in all artistic gymnastics event and won four gold and one silver medal. He also won four gold medals at the 1954 world championships, sharing the all-around gold medal with Viktor Chukarin and the floor gold medal with Masao Takemoto.

Biography
Muratov's father worked at a munitions factory in Moscow; he volunteered to fight in World War II and went missing in action in 1942. Valentin then took his place at the munitions factory to support his mother. After the war ended, he went back to school, where he was introduced to gymnastics.

In 1951, Muratov married Sofia Muratova, a fellow Olympic gymnast. They had two sons, Sergei (b. 1952) and Andrei (b. 1961); Sergei later also became a gymnast and gymnastic coach. The careers of both parents were marred with injuries, which eventually forced them to retire in 1958 and 1964, respectively. They both went into coaching, with Valentin being the head coach of the Soviet team from 1960 to 1968.

References

External links

1928 births
2006 deaths
Soviet male artistic gymnasts
Russian male artistic gymnasts
Olympic gymnasts of the Soviet Union
Gymnasts at the 1952 Summer Olympics
Gymnasts at the 1956 Summer Olympics
Olympic gold medalists for the Soviet Union
Olympic silver medalists for the Soviet Union
Olympic medalists in gymnastics
Gymnasts from Moscow
People from Serpukhov
People from Moscow Governorate
Medalists at the 1956 Summer Olympics
Medalists at the 1952 Summer Olympics
Medalists at the World Artistic Gymnastics Championships